Patrick Vibert-Vichet (born 3 February 1959) is a French rower. He competed at the 1984 Summer Olympics and the 1992 Summer Olympics.

References

External links
 

1959 births
Living people
French male rowers
Olympic rowers of France
Rowers at the 1984 Summer Olympics
Rowers at the 1992 Summer Olympics
Sportspeople from Haute-Savoie